Severe Torture is a Dutch death metal band, formed in 1997 by drummer Seth van de Loo and bassist Patrick Boleij.

History
The band was formed in 1997 by Thijs van Laarhoven on guitar, Seth van de Loo on drums, Erik de Windt on vocals, Jelle Schuurmans on guitar and Patrick Boleij on bass guitar. This lineup recorded a five song demo tape called Baptized in Virginal Liquid, produced by Vincent Dijkers, (Sinister, Houwitser), in 1998, a tape which eventually sold 600 copies all over the world. After releasing the demo, Erik left the group to join the Dutch death metal band Sinister. De Windt was replaced by Dennis Schreurs, and with this new line-up the band recorded a two song demo sent out to record labels. After receiving positive reactions, the band went on to play a gig with Immolation; Jelle left the group soon afterwards.

The band continued with four members, and signed a contract for one album with Fadeless Records. They later appeared at the No Mercy 2000 festival in Tilburg, and soon after embarked on their first tour, nine days across the Czech Republic, Slovakia, Germany, Belgium, and the Netherlands with Damnation, and the last three gigs with Pyaemia.

After this tour, they began recording their full-length debut, Feasting On Blood, at Franky's Recording Kitchen with producers Berthus Westerhuys and Robbie Woning. The artwork for the album was done by Joe Maloney. The album was released in October 2000 in Europe, and received American distribution through Hammerheart America in February 2001. To promote the album, Severe Torture embarked on a European tour in January 2001 together with Macabre, Broken Hope, and Die Apokalyptischen Reiter, a tour called "Masters of Murder 2001." In February 2001, The Plague Records changed into Hammerheart Records and offered Severe Torture a contract for another full-length album and an option for two more. In April, Severe Torture played in the United States, at the Ohio Death Fest (with Exhumed, Deeds of Flesh, and others), and two gigs with Pessimist and Burial.

After this U.S. trip, Severe Torture started writing for the next album. Again the album was recorded at Franky's Recording Kitchen with Berthus Westerhuys and Robbie Woning. The recordings were finished in March 2002 and right after Severe Torture went to the U.S. for a second time. They were on the "Bloodletting North America Part III" tour, the New England Metal and Hardcore Fest, and again at the Ohio Death Fest, and played five shows in Canada. During a five-week European tour with Cannibal Corpse in the fall, Severe Torture met guitarist Marvin Vriesde, who played session guitar for the German metal band Dew-Scented and guitar in the Dutch metal band Blo.Torch. A few months after the tour he was asked to join Severe Torture as second guitar player, which he did in the spring of 2003.

In 2005, the band signed a deal with Earache Records; a new album, Fall of the Despised, was released in Autumn of 2005. In May 2006 Severe Torture visited the U.S. for the third time, playing at the Maryland Deathfest, and that summer they toured Europe (40 shows) together with Vader as well.

In 2007, they released Sworn Vengeance, their fourth studio album.

In 2010 they signed with Season of Mist and released their fifth album Slaughtered.

In 2017, it was announced that founding drummer Seth van de Loo left the band, in early 2018, Damiën Kerpentier joined as the drummer.

In April 2022, Severe Torture released their first song in twelve years, "Fisting the Sockets", which is the title track from their EP of the same name, released on June 10. The band also plans to release a new full-length album, and their first in thirteen years, in 2023.

Members

Current members 
 Dennis Schreurs – vocals (1999–present)
 Thijs van Laarhoven – rhythm guitar (1997–present)
 Patrick Boleij – bass (1997–present)
 Marvin Vriesde – lead guitar (2003–present)
 Damiën Kerpentier – drums (2018–present)

Former members
 Eric de Windt – vocals (1997–1998)
 Jelle Schuurmans – guitar (1997–1999)
 Seth van de Loo – drums (1997-2017)

Timeline

Discography 
Feasting on Blood (2000)
Misanthropic Carnage (2002)
Fall of the Despised (2005)
Sworn Vengeance (2007)
Slaughtered (2010)

References

External links
Official website
Band profile on Earache Records website
Interview at Metal Storm

Dutch death metal musical groups
Musical groups established in 1997
Earache Records artists
Season of Mist artists